A bezoar is a mass often found trapped in the gastrointestinal system, though it can occur in other locations. A pseudobezoar is an indigestible object introduced intentionally into the digestive system.

There are several varieties of bezoar, some of which have inorganic constituents and others organic. The term has both modern (medical, scientific) and traditional usage.

Types

By content
 Food boluses (or boli; singular bolus) have the archaic and positive meaning of bezoar, and are composed of loose aggregates of food items such as seeds, fruit pith, or pits, as well as other types of items such as shellac, bubble gum, soil, and concretions of some medications.
 Lactobezoars are a specific type of food bezoar comprising inspissated milk. It is most commonly seen in premature infants receiving formula foods.
 Pharmacobezoars (or medication bezoars) are mostly tablets or semiliquid masses of drugs, normally found following an overdose of sustained-release medications.
 Phytobezoars are composed of indigestible plant material (e.g., cellulose), and are frequently reported in patients with impaired digestion and decreased gastric motility.
 Diospyrobezoar is a type of phytobezoar formed from unripe persimmons. Coca-Cola has been used to treat them.
 Trichobezoar is a bezoar formed from hair – an extreme form of hairball. Humans who frequently consume hair sometimes require these to be removed. In cases of Rapunzel syndrome, surgery may be required.

By location
 A bezoar in the esophagus is common in young children and in horses; in horses, it is known as choke.
 A bezoar in the large intestine is known as a fecalith.
 A bezoar in the trachea is called a tracheobezoar.

Cause

Esophageal bezoars discovered in nasogastrically fed patients on mechanical ventilation and sedation are reported to be due to the precipitation of certain food types rich in casein, which are precipitated with gastric acid reflux to form esophageal bezoars. Bezoars can also be caused by gastroparesis due to the slowing of gastric emptying, which allows food to form a bolus.

History
The word bezoar is derived from the Persian , literally "antidote". The myth of the bezoar as an antidote was introduced to Europe from the Middle East in the 11th century and remained popular until the 18th century. It was believed to have the power of a universal antidote, would work against any poison, and that a drinking glass which contained a bezoar could neutralize any poison poured into it.

They are gallstones or gallstone substitutes created from ox or cattle bile. Some products claim to remove toxins from the body.

The Andalusian physician Ibn Zuhr ( 1161), known in the West as Avenzoar, is thought to have made the earliest description of bezoar stones as medicinal items. Extensive reference to bezoars also appears in the Picatrix.

In 1567, French surgeon Ambroise Paré did not believe that it was possible for the bezoar to cure the effects of any poison and described an experiment to test the properties of the stone. A cook in the King's court was sentenced to death and chose to be poisoned. Paré administered the bezoar stone to the cook, but it had no effect, and the cook died in agony seven hours after taking the poison, proving that contrary to popular belief, the bezoar could not cure all poisons.

Modern examinations of the properties of bezoars by Gustaf Arrhenius and Andrew A. Benson of the Scripps Institution of Oceanography show that when bezoars are immersed in an arsenic-laced solution, they can remove the poison. The toxic compounds in arsenic are arsenate and arsenite; each is acted upon differently by the bezoars: arsenate is removed by being exchanged for phosphate in brushite found in the stones, while arsenite is bound to sulfur compounds in the protein of degraded hair, which is a key component in bezoars.

A famous case in the common law of England (Chandelor v Lopus, 79 Eng Rep. 3, Cro. Jac. 4, Eng. Ct. The case concerned a purchaser who sued for the return of the purchase price of an allegedly fraudulent bezoar.

Bezoars were important objects in cabinets of curiosity and natural history collections, mainly for their use in early modern pharmacy and the study of animal health.

The Merck Manual of Diagnosis and Therapy notes that consumption of unripened persimmons has been identified as the main cause of epidemics of intestinal bezoars and that up to 90 percent of bezoars that occur from excessive consumption require surgery for removal.

A 2013 review of three databases identified 24 publications presenting 46 patients treated with Coca-Cola for phytobezoars. A total of 91.3% of patients had complete resolution after treatment with Coca-Cola: 50% after a single treatment, with others requiring cola plus endoscopic removal. Doctors resorted to surgical removal in four cases.

See also
 Bezoardicum
 Coca-Cola treatment of phytobezoars
 Enterolith
 Fecalith
 Gastrolith
 Goa stone
 Gorochana
 List of English words of Persian origin
 Regurgitalith
 Snake-stones
 Toadstone

References

Bibliography
 Barry Levine. 1999. Principles of Forensic Toxicology. Amer. Assoc. for Clinical Chemistry. .
 Martín-Gil FJ, Blanco-Ávarez JI, Barrio-Arredondo MT, Ramos-Sanchez MC, Martin-Gil J. Jejunal bezoar caused by a piece of apple peel – Presse Med, 1995 Feb. 11; 24(6):326.
 
 This article incorporates text from a publication now in the public domain:

Further reading 
 Borschberg, Peter, "The Euro-Asian Trade in Bezoar Stones (approx. 1500-1700)", Artistic and Cultural Exchanges between Europe and Asia, 1400–1900: Rethinking Markets, Workshops and Collections, ed. Thomas DaCosta Kaufmann and Michael North, Aldershot: Ashgate, 2010, pp. 29–43.
 Borschberg, Peter, "The Trade, Forgery and Medicinal Use of Porcupine Bezoars in the Early Modern Period (c.1500–1750)", ed. Carla Alferes Pinto, Oriente, vol. 14, Lisbon: Fundação Oriente, 2006.

External links 

Gastrointestinal tract disorders
History of medicine
Magic items